A filling carousel is intended for filling large quantities of liquefied petroleum gas (LPG) cylinders. It consists of a frame with running wheels, rails, a central column for LPG and air,  and a driving unit the carousel frame around the central column. The speed of the carousel can be adapted to the various filling times and capacities. The dimension of the carousel is important to consider for the future filling capacity. The carousel frame chosen can be equipped with a number of filling scales, selected for the present demand and possible future demands. Filling carousels can be provided with equipment for automatic introduction and automatic filling scales with ejection of cylinders.

Dimensions

Frame sizes and approximate filling times for 12 kg cylinders with two-man operation:

Associated equipment

References

Liquefied petroleum gas
Industrial automation